Woodvale is a rural locality in the City of Greater Bendigo, in the Australian state of Victoria.

History 
Woodvale was first occupied by the Dja Dja Wurrung people who called the area "Nerring". European settlement in Woodvale began in 1845 when the locality was located in Myers Flat, Then known as "Myers Creek".  When gold was discovered in 1852, the area became known as "Sydney Flat". In the 1920's Sydney Flat became known as "Woodvale".

References

Towns in Victoria (Australia)
Suburbs of Bendigo